Buteo sanya is an extinct species of Buteo that went extinct in the Late Pleistocene epoch. Fossils for this species have been found in the Luobidang Cave site in Hainan, China.

References

Pleistocene birds
Buteo
Pleistocene animals of Asia
Fossils of China